Neomixis is a genus of small forest birds that are endemic to Madagascar.

The genus was introduced by the English zoologist Richard Bowdler Sharpe in 1881. The type species is the stripe-throated jery (Neomixis striatigula).  The genus was formerly placed in the Old World babbler family but is now considered to belong to the family Cisticolidae.

The genus comprises three species:

 Stripe-throated jery (Neomixis striatigula)
 Common jery (Neomixis tenella)
 Green jery (Neomixis viridis)

Another species the wedge-tailed jery (Hartertula flavoviridis) was until recently placed in this genus but biochemical studies suggest its true relationships lie elsewhere.

References

Cibois, Alice; Slikas, Beth; Schulenberg, Thomas S. & Pasquet, Eric (2001): An endemic radiation of Malagasy songbirds is revealed by mitochondrial DNA sequence data. Evolution 55(6): 1198–1206. DOI:10.1554/0014-3820(2001)055[1198:AEROMS]2.0.CO;2 PDF fulltext
Ryan, Peter (2006). Family Cisticolidae (Cisticolas and allies). pp. 378–492 in del Hoyo J., Elliott A. & Christie D.A. (2006) Handbook of the Birds of the World. Volume 11. Old World Flycatchers to Old World Warblers Lynx Edicions, Barcelona 
 Nguembock B.; Fjeldsa J.; Tillier A.; Pasquet E. (2007): A phylogeny for the Cisticolidae (Aves: Passeriformes) based on nuclear and mitochondrial DNA sequence data, and a re-interpretation of a unique nest-building specialization. Molecular Phylogenetics and Evolution 42: 272–286.

 
Bird genera
Cisticolidae
 
Taxonomy articles created by Polbot